Stephen G. Alter is professor of History at Gordon College, Wenham. Alter received his B.M. from Southern Methodist University, M.A. from Rice University and Ph.D. from University of Michigan.

His 2005 work published from the Johns Hopkins University Press is the first "full-length study" of William Dwight Whitney.

Bibliography

References

Living people
Southern Methodist University alumni
Rice University alumni
University of Michigan College of Literature, Science, and the Arts alumni
Year of birth missing (living people)